USS Vent (ARS-29) was a  commissioned by the U.S. Navy during World War II. Her task was to come to the aid of stricken vessels.

Vent was laid down on 29 January 1943 at Bellingham, Washington, by the Bellingham Marine Railway Co., launched on 30 June 1943, and commissioned on 7 April 1944.

World War II service 

Following shakedown, Vent departed Long Beach, California, with YC-1048 in tow, on 16 June 1944. She arrived in Hawaiian waters 11 days later and delivered her tow. She participated in salvage operations on five LST's which had been set afire by an accidental explosion and had sunk in West Loch, Pearl Harbor on 21 May. On 23 July. she sailed for the South Pacific Ocean and arrived at Funafuti. Ellice Islands on 7 August. From there, she pushed on for Milne Bay and Manus.

South Pacific operations 

Subsequently operating out of Espiritu Santo in the New Hebrides, Vent touched at Efate, Noumea, and Guadalcanal.

End-of-war operations 

The salvage ship returned to Pearl Harbor in March 1945 for an overhaul and, while in the Hawaiian Islands, salvaged Fleet Marine force equipment sunk off Hilo from 3 to 5 May. On 2 June, she sailed west once more and proceeded via Eniwetok in the Marshalls to the Marianas. The ship conducted harbor clearance and salvage operations in Tanapag Harbor, Saipan, into the summer of 1945. The end of the war in August. however. meant little to the ship's deployment-for there was much salvage be done in the wake of the war.

Rescuing craft grounded by typhoon 

The destructive typhoon which swirled into the fleet anchorage at Buckner Bay, Okinawa, in October 1945, swept many small craft ashore. Vent participated in salvaging a number of AFD's grounded on the beaches of Buckner Bay. The salvage ship later operated in the Marianas before she sailed. via Pearl Harbor, for the west coast of the United States and arrived at San Pedro, California, on 21 June 1946.

Decommissioning 

Subsequently decommissioned on 30 August 1946, Vent was struck from the Navy List on 12 March 1948 and sold to Henry J. Barbey on 30 June 1948.

Military awards and honors 

Vents crew members were eligible for the following medals:
 American Campaign Medal
 Asiatic-Pacific Campaign Medal
 World War II Victory Medal
 Navy Occupation Service Medal (with Asia clasp)

References

External links 
 

 

Diver-class rescue and salvage ships
Ships built in Bellingham, Washington
World War II auxiliary ships of the United States
1943 ships